The Egyptian football league system refers to the hierarchically interconnected league system (league pyramid) for association football in Egypt. All divisions are bound together by the principle of promotion and relegation. The system consists of just four levels with the top level being the only professional league and the only one that contains one division. Below this, the semi-professional and amateur levels have progressively more parallel divisions, which each cover progressively smaller geographic areas. Teams that finish at the top of their division at the end of each season can rise higher in the pyramid, while those that finish at the bottom find themselves sinking further down. In theory it is possible for even the lowest local amateur club to rise to the top of the system and become Egyptian football champions one day. The number of teams promoted and relegated between the divisions varies, and promotion to the upper levels of the pyramid is usually contingent on meeting additional criteria, especially concerning appropriate facilities and finances.

Structure
The Egyptian football league system is held under the jurisdiction of the nationwide Egyptian Football Association, along with its regional associations around the country.

On top of the system sit the level one Egyptian Premier League, the only professional football league in the country. It's followed by level two Egyptian Second Division, the highest semi-professional league that, as of the 2019–20 season, consist of three groups based on clubs geographic areas.

Level three Egyptian Third Division is the second highest semi-professional league in the system. The number of teams and groups in the league change every season due various reasons. The lowest football league system in Egypt is level four Egyptian Fourth Division, the only amateur league in the system. The number of teams and groups in the league also change every season due various reasons.

References

External links 
 
 Egypt Development League

Football in Egypt